The Orvall Gammill Barn is a historic barn on the northeast side of Stone County Road 87 northwest of Big Springs, Arkansas.  It is a two-story structure, built out of a combination of logs and timber framing, with a gable roof, the gable oriented toward the road.  It is built in a transverse crib pattern, with a series of log cribs fashioned out of hand-hewn logs joined by V notches, with a wood framed loft area above.  A shed addition extends along the building's north side.  It was built in 1922 by Orvall Gammill, and is locally unusual due to its transverse crib form being executed in logs rather than lumber framing.

The barn was listed on the National Register of Historic Places in 1985.

See also
National Register of Historic Places listings in Stone County, Arkansas

References

Barns on the National Register of Historic Places in Arkansas
Buildings and structures completed in 1922
Buildings and structures in Stone County, Arkansas
National Register of Historic Places in Stone County, Arkansas
1922 establishments in Arkansas